Christine Jensen is a composer, conductor, and saxophonist based in Montreal, Quebec, Canada. She was awarded the Juno Award for Contemporary Jazz Album of the Year for her albums Habitat (2014) and Treelines (2011). She is the sister of trumpeter Ingrid Jensen.

Jensen received her Bachelor's degree in Jazz Performance at McGill University in 1994, and later her Master's in 2006. She has studied under the tutelage of Pat LaBarbera, Jim McNeely, Kenny Werner, and Steve Wilson.

Jensen has collaborated with many artists including her sister, Ingrid, Ben Monder, Lorne Lofsky, Allison Au, Phil Dwyer, Donny McCaslin, Geoffrey Keezer, Brad Turner, and Lenny Pickett.

She is a former faculty member at McGill University's Schulich School of Music, as well as current Assistant Professor of Jazz Studies at Eastman School of Music.

Discography 

 2006 - A Shorter Distance
 2006 - Look Left
 2006 - Collage
 2011 - Treelines - Christine Jensen Jazz Orchestra
 2013 - Transatlantic Conversations: 11 Piece Band
 2014 - Habitat - Christine Jensen Jazz Orchestra
 2017 - Under the Influence Suite - Orchestre National de Jazz de Montreal
 2017 - Infinitude

References 

Living people
1970 births
Canadian saxophonists
21st-century Canadian women musicians
McGill University alumni
Academic staff of McGill University
Musicians from British Columbia
Canadian jazz composers
Canadian jazz bandleaders
Whirlwind Recordings artists